The Ambassador of Malaysia to Ukraine is the head of Malaysia's diplomatic mission to Ukraine. The position has the rank and status of an Ambassador Extraordinary and Plenipotentiary and is based in the Embassy of Malaysia, Kyiv.

List of heads of mission

Ambassadors to Poland and concurrently accredited to Ukraine

Ambassadors to Ukraine

See also
 Malaysia–Ukraine relations

References 

 
Ukraine
Malaysia